Pelister National Park is a national park in the Municipality of Bitola, North Macedonia. Among flora elements, the presence is especially significant of the five-needle pine molica, Pinus peuce - a unique species of Cenozoic age being present on only a few mountains in the Balkan Peninsula. The beauty of the landscape is enhanced by the diverse wildlife: bears, roe deer, wolves, chamois, deer, wild boars, rabbits, several species of eagles, partridges, red-billed choughs, and the endemic Macedonian Pelagonia trout.

Description
Pelister is the oldest and second largest national park in North Macedonia after Mavrovo. It is one of the leading tourist areas in the country, since it is a well-known ski resort, along with Ohrid, Prespa, Dojran, Popova Šapka, and Kruševo.
From Pelister one can see the Pelagonia valley, Lake Prespa, mountains Nidže, Galičica, Jakupica, and the city of Bitola. Pelister is one of the most southern mountains in the Balkans that has an alpine character.
Pelister is also known for its two mountain lakes, which are called Pelister's Eyes. Here are the sources of many rivers. The climate in Pelister National Park is diverse.

References

National parks of North Macedonia
Bitola Municipality